, son of Kujō Yukinori and adopted son of Nijō Munehira, was a Japanese kugyō (court noble) of the Edo period (1603–1868). He had two sons  and Nijō Harutaka. As Shigeyori had died at a young age, Munemoto adopted Harutaka as his son.

Ancestry

References

 

1727 births
1754 deaths
Fujiwara clan
Nijō family